Storehouse No. 4, also known as the Eagle Point Storehouse, is an historic storehouse located on International Street in Hyder, Alaska. It was built in 1896 under supervision of engineer David du Bose Gaillard. It was listed on the National Register of Historic Places in 1976.

It is one of the first masonry structures to be built in Alaska. The reason for its construction is uncertain from period documents, but it appears to have been related to the Alaska boundary dispute with Canada. This dispute was resolved by arbitration in 1903, resulting in the transfer in 1906 of the territories containing two of the other three storehouses to Canada.

See also
Storehouse No. 3
National Register of Historic Places listings in Prince of Wales–Hyder Census Area, Alaska

References 

Military facilities on the National Register of Historic Places in Alaska
Commercial buildings completed in 1896
Buildings and structures on the National Register of Historic Places in Prince of Wales–Hyder Census Area, Alaska